The 2017 Formula Renault Northern European Cup is the twelfth Formula Renault Northern European Cup season, an open-wheel motor racing series for emerging young racing drivers based in Europe.

Drivers and teams
 For the Spa event, some drivers used different numbers in line with Eurocup Formula Renault 2.0 regulations; each driver's Spa race number is displayed in tooltips.

Calendar
The provisional calendar for the 2017 season was announced on 2 December 2016. On 28 December 2016 was confirmed that Circuit Paul Ricard will host the seventh venue for the season.

A revision of the calendar reduced the number of rounds to five and amended the clashes between the series and the Eurocup series. At Spa NEC drivers joined Eurocup drivers on the grid, but the Eurocup drivers were ineligible to score points, and despite that on track races 1 & 3 were won by Sacha Fenestraz and race 2 by Gabriel Aubry they didn't receive NEC trophies.

Championship standings
Points system
Points were awarded to the top 20 classified finishers.

Drivers' championship

Teams' championship

Footnotes

References

External links
 Official website of the Formula Renault 2.0 NEC championship

NEC
Formula Renault 2.0 NEC
Renault NEC